Myint Naing is a Burmese politician and former political prisoner who currently serves as Chief Minister of Sagaing Region and previously served as an Amyotha Hluttaw member of parliament for Sagaing Region Constituency № 3. In the 1990 Burmese general election, he was elected as an Pyithu Hluttaw MP, winning a majority of 30,628 (76% of the votes), but was never allowed to assume his seat.

Early life and education

Myint Naing graduated with a medical degree (MBBS) from the Mandalay Institute of Medicine in 1981.

Political career

He was arrested in September 1990 and sentenced to 25 years under the Burmese Penal Code's Article 122. He actively took part together with his colleagues in the famous Saffron Revolution.

In 2012, he was elected as member of House of Nationalities following the 2012 Myanmar by-elections. In the 2015 general election, Myint Naing ran for Sagaing Region Hluttaw and was re-elected. In 2016, he was appointed as Chief Minister of Sagaing Region by the President of Myanmar with the recommendation of Sagaing Region Hluttaw.

In the wake of the 2021 Myanmar coup d'état on 1 February, Myint Maung was detained by the Myanmar Armed Forces.

References

Members of the House of Nationalities
National League for Democracy politicians
Prisoners and detainees of Myanmar
Burmese physicians
1951 births
Living people
People from Sagaing Region
University of Medicine, Mandalay alumni